Dean Chalkley (born 2 April 1968) is a British photographer from Southend-on-Sea.

Early life 

Dean Chakley's first years were spent on a farm in Essex where his parents were labourers. At the age of seven the family moved to Southend-on-Sea where he eventually attended Fairfax High School for boys, in Westcliff-on-Sea.

It was the 1980s, the time of the mod revival. He describes himself as having been "...a hardened mod, totally into scooters, dressing flamboyantly, in cravats and so on."

Towards the late 1980s, acid house coincided with his discovery of photography, although initially after leaving school his interest had been in Fashion, especially the type influenced by music. He trained for and became a bespoke trouser maker for a couple of years but on realising the debt involved in setting up shop, he decided to become a civil servant and remained working as one for seven years.

During this time, the Civil Service sent him on an A-Level course in photography, since it was applicable to his work there. This in turn led to a photography degree at Blackpool and The Fylde College.

On completing his degree course he moved to London and assisted two notable photographers, Malcolm Venville and afterwards Seamus Ryan, whom he assisted full-time for a period of about 1 and a half years.

Professional career 

It was during Chalkley's Degree that he first starting shooting for Dazed & Confused, the first assignment being to shoot Helen Chadwick. This was when it was still based in Brewer Street; and under the founding editors Jefferson Hack and Rankin, as well as Art Director Mark Saunders. With his first spotlight feature on his photography in issue 13 which was followed by Chalkley's coverage of bands such as Solar Race in issue 17, Darren Almond in 1997, Angus Farhurst and many more YBA for Issue 34 and beyond including Sam Taylor Wood, Mat Collshaw, Douglas Gordon, Cerith Wyn Evan, Gillian Wearing.

Chalkley also became a regular contributor to Mixmag, shooting the covers and inside features, travelling to Iceland with dance duo Propellerheads for example, and spending lengths of time covering club-season Ibiza.

Dean's work has worked in various fields including editorial and commercial advertising however he has always kept up with his own projects where he has explored his own areas of interest such as Music, Fashion and Art. These areas of study have produced both photographic bodies of work as well as Moving image pieces.

Chalkley's film Strip was accepted into and screened at several short film festivals around the world, and won the Kinofilm 2000 Best Experimental Short Film award at the International Short Film Festival in Manchester.

After growing less satisfied with the advertising work, he and his (then) agent Yogi decided to part ways. Dean says of the departure, "…the editorial side that I liked, and the fuel that I needed, was being overwhelmed by jobs that were a little too broad."

After spending a year without an agent, Dean met photographer Paul Rider who introduced him to his wife Adele Rider, agent and now director of the photographer's agency Shoot.

In July 2012, Dean signed to the photographic agency, Skinny Dip.

Music

Dean started shooting for the New Musical Express magazine in 2001, with The Verve's Richard Ashcroft his first subject. Having been introduced to the magazine by current NME Photography Director Marian Paterson, he continues to shoot covers and features for the magazine today. This has proved a successful working partnership with Dean winning the Portrait Photographer of the Year at the 2006 Picture Editors' Awards after having submitted his portrait of Oasis singer songwriter Noel Gallagher, a shoot commissioned by the NME. He has shot amongst many others, Ian Brown, Pete Doherty, The White Stripes, Oasis, Arctic Monkeys, Kings of Leon, Amy Winehouse, Hollywood actress and singer Scarlett Johansson, American rapper and entrepreneur Jay-Z, and Simon Cowell, British entrepreneur, music executive, television producer and celebrity In 2013, Dean is still top of his game, regularly producing epic covers for the NME including Beady Eye, Daft Punk, The Vaccines, The NME Awards 2013 and Foals.

As well as shooting within the music genre for magazines such the NME and Uncut, Dean also undertakes commissions from record companies, shooting artist's and band's album's and single's artwork along with their press photography. He has, to name but a few, shot for XL Recordings, Sony, Island Records and Acid Jazz providing pictures for the following:

Dizzee Rascal's Mercury Prize winning album Boy in da Corner (2003)

Lily Allen's single LDN (2006)

The Horrors’ single artwork for Gloves (2007)

New Young Pony Club's Fantastic Playroom (2007)

Tinchy Stryder's Third Strike (2010)

Paul Weller's album Wake Up The Nation

Fashion
The relaunch of Dean Chalkley's "New Look" website in 2012 saw the inclusion of a new Fashion section, clearly displaying Dean's extensive sartorial side. With projects and campaigns for the likes of Hush Puppies, Ray-Ban, Beatrix Ong, Levis, New Balance, The Observer, The New British and Cath Kidston.

Advertising
Dean has also returned to shooting "fun and edgy" advertising work such as the Keep Britain Tidy campaign.

Editorial
He has also been shooting some fashion work for client's such as Sport and Street magazine and Levi's and likes to shoot for The Observer magazine for which he has photographed actors such as Rhys Ifans, Dominic West, Rupert Everett, Bond girl Eva Green, former model and author Sophie Dahl, Clémence Poésy in 2010, Holly Willoughby and Jack Monroe in 2014. Chalkley shot Jake Bugg for an article by Krissi Murison for The Times published on 21 September 2014.

Chalkley has been a supporter and contributor of The New British Magazine since 'Issue Zero' and was present during the launch of the App version of the publication at the Apple store taking part in a Q&A at the flagship UK store on 4 December 2014. Fellow contributors of the magazine have been Neville Brody, Nick Knight and Magnum Photographers. For the 'Legacy' issue Dean contributed a large project consisting of a photographic essay and short film Arena.

Books
Having already shot Russell Brand for his memoir My Booky Wook Chalkley was asked to produce the cover for Brand's book Revolution published in 2014.

DJing
To this day the photographer also continues to DJ with vinyl at several club nights, most frequently at Shake! at the boogaloo which took place at the Boogaloo bar in Highgate, London. In 2013 Dean DJ'd at Isle of Wight Festival alongside fellow Black Cat DJ Si Cheeba.

Dean DJ'ed at the Soul Casino with Si Cheeba at the Vintage New Year's Eve party at London's South Bank Centre bringing in 2014.

Exhibitions 

Having shot many of today's leading pop and rock musicians and bands led to Dean's exhibition Now Stand Tall! Icons of the new sonic generation which opened in February 2006 at The Spitz gallery in London's Spitalfields. In collaboration with this, he also arranged three accompanying gigs at the venue. On 27 July 2006 the exhibition went on to open at Birmingham's Snap Galleries and remained there for several months. The exhibition is still available online and the gallery's director Guy White continues to sell limited edition prints.

Southend's Underground 
Southend’s Underground opened in August 2006 at The Spitz gallery. "It was a snapshot of the thriving music scene that's grown up around the now defunct Junk Club and bands like The Horrors and These New Puritans." Part of the show went on to exhibit in Florence, Italy at the Pitti Imagine Uomo festival in June 2007, and in October 2007 it was part of the Family Viewing exhibition, Teenage Kicks Episode in Shoreditch, London, and culminated in a final show entitled The End at Homestead in Clerkenwell, London.

Serge 
Dean's short film Serge and accompanying exhibition of "emotive and graceful studies" of Physical Culturists premiered at The Rex cinema and bar, in June 2005.

In 2008 Dean was asked to contribute some of his live images of The Horrors and Kings of Leon to the 100 Club's permanent exhibition, curated by Emily Beaver.

Ray Ban 
Later in the same year and again in early 2009, Dean travelled as far a field as New York City, Beijing and finally Milan to be brought together with the young stars of the contemporary music scene to advertise the re-launch of the Ray-Ban Clubmaster sunglasses. Dean documented the artists as they recorded in the studio and performed at the Ray-Ban events and exhibitions which were the results of the photographic project.

In October 2009 Dean exhibited at Camden's Roundhouse to celebrate the opening of the 2009 Electric Proms. The photographs displayed consisted of some of radio's finest faces, commissioned by the BBC. Subjects included dj's Lauren Laverne, Cerys Matthews, Craig Charles, Tom Robinson amongst others.

The New Faces 
On 4 March 2010, Dean opened a new show at The Book Club in Shoreditch, London. The exhibition title 'The New Faces' was thought of by none other than 'Modfather' Paul Weller who Dean had recently shot. The exhibition- a collection of studio photographs shot towards the end of last year, shows a group of sharply dressed young Mods, their attitude and their dance moves. The show ran until 29 April 2010. In 2012 Dean released "The New Faces: A Short Film", which was released exclusively on Nick Knight's curated ShowStudio.com.

Exhibition 
Originally only meant to run from 20 March 2014 to 20 April 2014 the exhibition featuring erotic images of the model known only as "Tess" were exhibited at Trisha's in Soho until 9 May 2014.

21 
Taking place at Quaglino's to celebrate their 21's birthday, Chalkley exhibited 21 photographs portraying the heroes and heroines from the contrmpory music scene. Featured in this exhibition were portraits of Daft Punk, Noel Gallagher, The White Stripes and more.

Return of the Rudeboy 
Return of the Rudeboy was created by the photographer and film-maker Dean Chalkley and the Creative Director Harris Elliott and was on show at Somerset House from 13 June 2014 until 25 August 2014. The exhibition featured over 60 portraits of notable individuals that embodied the 21st Century Rudeboy including the likes of Don Letts, Pauline Black, Gary Powell and more.

Moving image

Arena

Screened at the V&A Museum London on Friday 27 September 2013 as part of its Friday Lates sessions. The film spins around the Crash Bang Wallop World of Banger Racing, a 12-minute long ode to the sport and various characters from the Spedeworth Racing Track in Aldershot. The film went on to form part of The New British App 'Legacy' which Launched on 4 December at the Apple flagship store in London.

Young Souls

This project, sparked by a commission from 125 Magazine, had to be completed in an extremely short time frame, Having met up with the 125 Magazine Art Director Rob Crane three days before Christmas, inviting Chalkley to submit inline with the next issue's theme of "Religion" with the deadline being the end of February. The work took the form of a photographic series and short film which was written, directed and produced by Dean himself.

The cast of the film were gathered through "putting the word out" on Northern Soul community websites and forums. In January 2011, a message was posted on Dean Chalkley's official Blog requesting"Good youthful Northern Soul Dancers to feature in a short film and photographic project". and that the project would then be presented through 125 Magazine. A later post, by Amanda Ashed of Looks London and the Ranch Casting Company mentioned that the project would be a short film that wasn't set out to be a "definitive story of Northern Soul" but that it "does aim to celebrate it." And that the project had no outside funding. This point has been reiterated since by Chalkley himself, who in an interview with the British Journal of Photography, referred to the project as being a "Labour of Love"

In this later post by Ashed a call was put out asking for dancers of all ages to get in contact for the filming side of the project that would take place on 30 January.

On 5 April 2011 a 25-second teaser of the short film Young souls was released on Dean Chalkley's official Vimeo. Later in April of the same year the photographic side to the project was published in 125 Magazine. This was a "study focusing on the current Burgeoning generation of young people getting into the scene."

Being a DJ and running his own club nights around London where he plays rare soul music (Black Cat and Shake! at the Boogaloo); Dean witnessed the interest of a younger generation who were interested in northern soul and not just for the short term; 'These are real people who spend all their money on this because they love it, not because it's the flavour of the month' In an interview with The Guardian in July Dean said about the film:

"I didn’t want to just recreate the past, but I did aim to produce timeless works that illustrate the culture as never before. It is great to show how people dance to Northern Soul music, but more importantly how it is a passionate experience, and how its devotees young and old are immersed in it."

The film was made available to view online from 125 Magazine's website in July 2011 following the short film's premier at Bethnal Green's Working men's club in London, which was attended by many of the participants in the film who took to the floor after the first screening was greeted with rapturous applause Following from the films screening and online launch, as well as the publication of 16 images in 125 Magazine Young Souls was exhibited at PYMCA's Youth Club Gallery. The Exhibition consisted of the original 16 images with some new editions, which added up to 22 in total. These went on display alongside the film Young Souls. On the night of the private view Kent Record's Ady Croasdell, Jo Wallace, who are credited as Music Consultant's on the film DJed alongside Donna Driscoll and Chalkley himself. The Exhibition at Youth Club Gallery ran from 21 July 2011 until 16 August 2011. Young Souls was screened at Turner Contemporary in Margate on 28 October 2013.

Young Souls Reviews

"The film is very, very, very authentic." "It 's absolutely beautifully filmed, It’s the kind of thing that I’ll come back to and watch again… …so that I can get all of the nuances of it. – Ian Dewhurst. 
	
"It is really a homage." – Eddie Piller. 
	
"It was beautifully shot. Dean is a genius photographer." – Jonny Owens 
	
"[The] film... ...is seriously good in terms of the cinematography, sound, aesthetics etc., and (perfectly captured in the still photos) the dancing is so damn cool it hurts."- Bryony Quin, It's Nice That

Strip 
2000, BW & Colour, 10 mins
Written and produced by Dean Chalkley, music & sound by Geir Jenssen, edited by Suki, 2000.
A synopsis of film on Chalkley's website states: "Tension, excitement and anticipation grow, images from a previous era relate to the characters and events of the present. Time continuums appear to merge as mankind and machinery axis about this strip of tarmac."

Serge 
Written and directed by Dean Chalkley, music by Golden Globe award winner Johann Johannsson, edited by Spencer Doane, 2005

Eddyfink, In For Me 
Video promo, written and directed by Dean Chalkley and Spencer Doane, edited by Spencer Doane, produced by Will Haynes, 2007

No Bra, She was a Butcher 
Video promo, a collaboration between Dean Chalkley and Ciaran O’Shea, 2008

External links 
 http://www.deanchalkley.com/
 http://www.skinnydip.co.uk/
 https://web.archive.org/web/20080322033426/http://www.nme.com/home
 http://www.snapgalleries.com/
Dean Chalkley about Northern Soul (Interview)

References 

1. 'The F2 Profile' by David Land, F2 FREELANCE PHOTOGRAPHER magazine, February/March 2008, Vol 1, No.6

2. http://www.professionalphotographer.co.uk/interviews/dean-chalkley-profile

3. 'Special Agents' by Gavin Stoker, Professional Photographer magazine, December 2008

4. https://web.archive.org/web/20110724105051/http://www.ipcmedia.com/press/article.php?id=82119

5. https://web.archive.org/web/20100502004813/http://playlouder.com/content/4766/chalkley-says-cheese

6. http://www.rexbar.co.uk/mailer/2005/mailer13-06-05.htm

Photographers from Essex
Living people
1968 births
People from Southend-on-Sea